Bariba, also known as Baatonum (also Baatombu, Baatonu, Barba, Baruba, Berba and a number of various other names and spellings), is the language of the Bariba people of Benin and Nigeria and was the language of the state of Borgu.

It is primarily spoken in Benin, but also across the border in adjacent Kwara State and Niger State, Nigeria, and some Bariba are in Togo and Burkina Faso. Welmers (1952) reported the Bariba language as spoken in the cities of Nikki, Parakou, Kandi, and Natitingou.

Names
The language can be known by different names:
the Bariba people call their language Baatɔnum;
the Yoruba people call the language Baruba;
the Hausa people refer to the language as Borganci (also spelled Borganchi) after Borgu where it is spoken;
the names in the Busa language and the Boko language are Borgu and Borgunya.
Other names include Barba or Berba.

One person who speaks Bariba is called Baatɔnu and two or more persons or speakers are called Baatɔmbu and the language of the Baatɔmbu/Borgawa people is called Baatɔnum.

Geographic distribution 
In Nigeria, Bariba is spoken mainly in Borgu LGA of Niger State and in Baruten LGA of Kwara state. A number of Bariba have migrated to other parts of Nigeria, including Abuja. The Bariba people are referred to as Borgawa in Hausa.

In Benin, Bariba is spoken mainly in Alibori, Donga, Atakora and Borgou departments. A number of Bariba have migrated to other parts of Benin, including Cotonou.

In Togo, Bariba is spoken in the Savanes Region.

In Burkina Faso, Bariba is spoken in Kompienga Province.

Classification 
Bariba is usually classed as an independent member of the Savanna languages, but some consider it and a number of other languages, such as Miyobe, as a Gur language. However, other than Bariba, there are other unclassified Gur languages, including Miyobe, Koromfe, Viemo, and Natyoro.

Phonology
Bariba is a tonal language. Tonal patterns in Bariba have been claimed to present a challenge to the Two-Feature Model of tonal phonology.

Nouns
Bariba has 7 noun classes:

1. y-class
2. t-class
3. g-class
4. w-class
5. m-class
6. s-class
7. n-class

The data was collected by William E. Welmers in August and September 1949 at Nikki, Benin.

y-class
The y-class is the largest noun class. y-class singular nouns usually in -a.

t-class
All forms end in -ru for t-class nouns.

g-class
Forms usually end in back vowels for g-class nouns.

w-class

m-class
m-class nouns often end in -m.

s-class
The s-class is a small noun class. Most forms are collectives and end in -su.

n-class
The n-class is a small noun class. Most forms are collectives and end in -nu.

Verbs

Aspects
There are 7 primary verb aspects in Bariba:

consecutive
habitual
continuative
frequentative
imperative
past
past negative

There are 5 verb classes, which are grouped according to the formation of the past aspect.

List of verbs
Consecutive verb forms are given below. S denotes stative forms.

Adjectives
Invariable adjectives:

Adjectives with a class of their own, which remains the same after all nouns; singular and plural forms are like those of nouns:

t-class adjectives:

g-class adjectives:

Attributive adjectives with alternants for each noun class:

Numerals

References

External links
 Baatonum at WolframAlpha

Languages of Benin
Languages of Nigeria
Gur languages
Bariba people